The rawap or rubab (Tajik: Рубоб, Uzbek: rubob) is an Eastern Iranian fretted plucked long-necked stringed instrument also used in folk music by residents of the Uyghur autonomous region of Xinjiang, Western China.  The history of the instrument dates back to the Ancient Iran including modern Tajikistan and spreading in the 14th century to Turkic cultures including southern Xinjiang. It is an instrument of the Tajiks also used in Uzbekistan. It's particularly associated with Tajik music and culture including Tajiks of Bukhara and  Samarkand.

Characteristics

The body of the instrument is a constructed box, a bowl (like the Neapolitan mandolin or the lute), or else the neck and bowl are carved from a single piece of mulberry wood. It is used to accompany songs, and is less common with larger instrumentation. Instead of a wooden soundboard, the opening across the top of the bowl has a dried snakeskin stretched across like on a banjo; alternatively, the hide of a donkey or sheep is used. It is strung with between three and nine strings, which run across the skin membrane on the bottom, up the long fretboard and connect to a pegbox, curved backward 180 degrees. Only some strings are struck with a plectrum. The rest are sympathetic strings, vibrating in reaction to the actively played strings. Something that sets this instrument apart visually are lateral extension above the wooden bowl, decorated goat horns mounted on the neck, curving toward the bowl. The neck is inlaid decorated. While the fingerboard is not fretted, photos of the instruments show that some instruments do have strings tied around the neck in the position of frets.

Variations

What the rawap is called among the Uyghurs varies according to each region, with names added as accessories.  For example Kaxgar-Rawap is the variation of the town Kashgar. The design, size and style of play differ from one region to another. The Kaschgar-region instrument is 90 centimeters long, with strings tuned in fourths and fifths. 

The rawap of the Dolan-population in the province Turpan has five melody strings. The first string is fingered and the others are resonance strings and drone strings.

For the Tajiks, the original instrument is called rubob and is made from the wood of the apricot tree. The Tajik original model is about 70 centimeters long. In the 1930s, the Uzbeks who borrowed from the original Tajik model, created a long-necked lute (rubap). The different forms are related to the rubob, an instrument Afghanistan which was part of ancient Iran.

Description
Similar to a lute, it has 7 strings in 3 courses.  Uyghur Rawaps have decorative goat horns above the body of the instrument and the body may be covered in hide or snakeskin. 

There are several varieties of rawap, among them: 
 Kasgar Rawap 90 centimeters long 5, 6 or 7 strings, one used the rest sympathetic
 Dolan Rawap – similar to the Afghan rubab, Dolan Muqam, one melody string, the rest sympathetic, pear shaped body
 Qoychi Rawap – short herder's rawap Hotan region, 70 centimeters long, 2–3 pairs sheep gut strings
 Qumul Rawap – used in Qumul Muqam
 Bas Rawap – three strings
 Caplima Rawap

References

External links
 The stringed Instrument Database
 Uyghur Musical Instrument
 Introducing the Uyghur 'Rawap'

String instruments
Chinese musical instruments
Uyghur musical instruments
Tajik musical instruments